Udiyan Bose (born 7 December 1993) is an Indian first-class cricketer who plays for Tripura.

References

External links
 

1993 births
Living people
Indian cricketers
Tripura cricketers
Cricketers from Tripura
People from Agartala